Thylacosceles is a genus of moths in the family Stathmopodidae.

Species
Thylacosceles acridomima Meyrick, 1889 (from New Zealand)
Thylacosceles angareuta   Meyrick, 1922 (from India)
Thylacosceles cerata  Meyrick, 1913 (from Sri Lanka)
Thylacosceles judex  Meyrick, 1913 (from Sri Lanka)
Thylacosceles pithanodes   Bradley, 1961 (from Guadalcanal)
Thylacosceles radians Philpott, 1918 (from New Zealand)

References

Meyrick, 1889 . Trans. N.Z. Inst. 21 : 165, 171
Markku Savela's ftp.funet.fi

Stathmopodidae
Moth genera